The Sisters of Saint Joseph of the Apparition  (French: Sœurs de Saint-Joseph-de-l'Apparition; Latin: Institutum Sororum a S. Joseph ab Apparitione; abbreviation: S.J.A.) is a religious institute of pontifical right whose members profess public vows of chastity, poverty, and obedience and follow the evangelical way of life in common.

Founding

Emily de Vialar was born into an aristocratic family in Gaillac, France on 12 September 1797. As the Sisters of Charity of Nevers cared for the sick poor and abandoned infants at their hospital, Emily decided to direct her attention to the education of poor children and she opened a school. A few young girls of Gaillac rallied round her, and on Christmas night 1832 she founded a Congregation, soon known as Sisters of St. Joseph of the Apparition.

The Sisters were called to Algeria, then to Tunisia and other countries round the Mediterranean. At Emilie's death, in Marseilles on 24 August 1856, her sisters were the first to settle in Australia.

Their mission includes missionary work, pastoral ministry, education of youth, care of the sick and aged.

The sisters have houses in Africa, Asia, Europe and Latin America. The Generalate of the Congregation can be found in Paris, France.

On 31 December 2005 there are 940 sisters in 154 communities.

References

External links
 Sisters of Saint Joseph of the Apparition official site

Catholic female orders and societies
Religious organizations established in 1832
Catholic religious institutes established in the 19th century
1832 establishments in France